KLRF may refer to:

 KLRF (FM), a radio station (88.5 FM) licensed to Milton-Freewater, Oregon, United States
 the ICAO code for Little Rock Air Force Base, in Little Rock, Arkansas, United States